Yowza! Animation is a 2D, 3D and Hybrid 2D/3D  animation studio based in Toronto, Ontario, Canada and founded by Claude Chiasson in June 1996. They specialize in providing additional animation and/or clean-up and ink-and-paint for various shorts and feature films. The studio also utilizes animation using Toon Boom Harmony.

On July 4, 2016, Heather Walker bought Yowza! Animation from founder Claude Chiasson.

Work

Disney Interactive video games

Commercials

 101 Dalmatians (1996)
 Instant Keno Lottery
 Nescafé
 Henry & Sally's
 Marinela
 Astro Yogurt
 Friday Night Nicktoons (2002)
 Xenical
 Applebee's
 Tropicana
 Barbie
 Best Buy/AMC Theatres (2005)
 Dunkin' Donuts (2006)
 Honda (2006-2008)
 CareerBuilder (2008)
 American Legacy Foundation (2008)
 Owens Corning
 Estée Lauder Companies (2017, with House Special)

References

External links

Canadian animation studios
Mass media companies established in 1996
Companies based in Toronto